Masten Space Systems was an aerospace manufacturer startup company in Mojave, California (formerly in Santa Clara, California) that was developing a line of vertical takeoff, vertical landing (VTVL) rockets, initially for uncrewed research sub-orbital spaceflights and eventually intended to support robotic orbital spaceflight launches.

In 2020, NASA awarded Masten a contract for a lunar lander mission; NASA was to pay Masten US$75.9 million for Masten to build and launch a lander called XL-1 to take NASA and other customer payloads to the south pole of the Moon. Masten Mission One would have been Masten's first space flight; it was scheduled for launch in November 2023. 

The company filed for Chapter 11 bankruptcy on July 2022, and was later acquired by Astrobotic Technology in September 2022.

Overview 

Masten Space Systems was a Mojave, California based rocket company that was developing a line of reusable VTVL spacecraft, and related rocket propulsion hardware.

Masten Space Systems competed in the NASA and Northrop Grumman Lunar Lander Challenge X Prize in 2009, winning the level one second prize of US$150,000 and the level two first prize of US$1,000,000. On 2 November 2009, it was announced that Masten Space Systems had won first place in the level two category, with Armadillo Aerospace coming in second.

Masten Space Systems was selected for the Lunar CATALYST initiative of the NASA on 30 April 2014.

Masten was accepted to make a bid for NASA's Commercial Lunar Payload Services (CLPS) program on 29 November 2018. Masten proposed to NASA that Masten would develop a lunar lander called XL-1 to take scientific payload to the Moon. NASA accepted this proposal to be assessed, whether it would be developed or not, as part of the CLPS program. NASA would later choose which of the bids made for CLPS program by the various companies eligible to bid for CLPS the agency would eventually fund for development.

On 8 April 2020, it was announced that NASA had selected Masten's CLPS bid to be developed. NASA awarded Masten a $75.9 million contract to build, launch, land and operate their XL-1 Moon lander. The lander would take payload from NASA and other customers to the south pole of the Moon. Masten Mission One, the first XL-1 lander, was scheduled for launch in November 2023.

Masten Space Systems filed for Chapter 11 bankruptcy on July 28, 2022. The company's assets were purchased for US$4.5 million by Astrobotic Technology on September 8, 2022, who continues to operate the company's test vehicles.

Xombie 

The primary goal of these two airframes was to demonstrate stable, controlled flight using a GN&C system developed in-house at Masten. XA-0.1B originally featured four engines with  thrust, but was converted in Spring 2009 to be powered by one engine of  thrust.

XA-0.1B, nicknamed "Xombie", first flew free of tether 19 September 2009, and qualified for the Lunar Lander Challenge Level One second prize of $150,000 on 7 October 2009.

In October 2016, NASA reported using Xombie to test the Landing Vision System (LVS), as part of the Autonomous Descent and Ascent Powered-flight Testbed (ADAPT) experimental technologies, for the Mars 2020 mission landing.

, Xombie had flown 224 times.

Xoie 
Masten's Xoie (model XA-0.1E) won the  Level Two prize of the Lunar Lander Challenge on October 30, 2009.

"Xoie", as the craft was nicknamed, qualified for the Lunar Lander Challenge level two on October 30, 2009.

Xaero
The Xaero reusable launch vehicle was a vertical-takeoff, vertical-landing (VTVL) rocket which was being developed by Masten in 2010–2011. It was proposed to NASA as a potential suborbital reusable launch vehicle (sRLV) for carrying research payloads under NASA's Flight Opportunities Program (initially known as the Commercial Reusable Suborbital Research/CRuSR program), projecting  altitude in initial flights of five to six minutes duration, while carrying a  research payload. It was propelled by the  Cyclops-AL-3 rocket engine burning isopropyl alcohol and liquid oxygen.

The first Xaero test vehicle flew 110 test flights before being destroyed in its 111th flight. During the record-setting flight on 11 September 2012, an engine valve stuck open during descent, and this was sensed by the control system. As designed, the flight termination system was triggered, destroying the vehicle before it could create a range safety problem. The final test flight was intended to test the vehicle at higher wind loads and altitudes, flying to an altitude of one kilometer while testing the flight controls at the higher ascent and descent velocities before returning to a precise landing point. The ascent and initial portion of the descent was nominal, prior to the stuck throttle valve which resulted in the termination of the flight prior to the planned precision landing.

Xaero-B
Xaero-B was a follow up to Xaero with the ability to reach  altitude with engine on throughout. Xaero-B was between 15 and 16 feet tall where Xaero was 12 feet tall. Xaero-B performed hot-fire testing and test flights. The vehicle has now been retired due to damage on a test flight in April 2017. It flew 75 times.

Xodiac 
The Xodiac was a VTVL rocket introduced in 2016. It featured pressure-fed LOX/IPA propellant, and a regeneratively cooled engine. Flights could simulate landing on the Moon or Mars. Video of Xodiac performing in-flight air flow tests Tuft strings.

Xogdor 
Xogdor was a VTVL vehicle that Masten planned to introduce in 2023.

Xeus 
Xeus (pronounced Zeus) was a vertical-landing, vertical-takeoff lunar lander demonstrator. Xeus consisted of a Centaur upper stage (from United Launch Alliance) with RL-10 main engine to which four Katana vertical thrusters have been added. Production Xeus was estimated to be able to land on the Moon with up to 14 tonnes (revised to 10 tonnes) payload when using the expendable version or 5 tonnes payload when using the reusable version.

The damaged Centaur on the demonstrator Xeus limited it to Earth flights. The production versions would have to have been manufacturing fault free and certified for space operations. Human rating might also have been needed. United Launch Alliance, supplier of the Centaur, referred to Xeus as an abbreviation for eXperimental Enhanced Upper Stage. Further details of the proposed design were given in the paper "Experimental Enhanced Upper Stage (XEUS): An affordable large lander system".

Each of the Katanas used on a Xeus lander were likely to produce  when performing a horizontal touchdown. In December 2012, Masten demonstrated their all-aluminum  regeneratively-cooled engine, the KA6A.

The talk in this video announced the Xeus and also showed NASA's Space Exploration Vehicle rover with its two astronauts as a possible payload for the XEUS.

On 30 April 2014, the NASA announced that Masten Space Systems was one of the three companies selected for the Lunar CATALYST initiative. NASA signed an unfunded Space Act Agreement (SAA) with Masten in September 2014. The SAA lasts until August 2017, has 22 milestones and calls for "End-to-end demonstration of hardware and software that enables a commercial lander on the Moon."

In December 2015, United Launch Alliance (ULA) were planning to upgrade the XEUS's main body from a Centaur Upper Stage to the Advanced Cryogenic Evolved Stage (ACES) which they were developing, significantly increasing the payload. Masten Space intended to incorporate experience from developing the XL family of cargo landers into the XEUS family of landers.

In August 2016, ULA's president and CEO said ULA intended to human rate both the Vulcan and ACES.

XEUS was cancelled in July 2018.

XL-1
The XL-1 was a small cargo lunar lander that Masten was developing as part of the Lunar CATALYST program (SAAM ID 18250). When powered by MXP-351 the XL-1 was designed to land  payloads onto the surface of the Moon.

On 11 October 2016, Masten Space Tweeted a video showing the test firing of its new bi-propellant combination, internally called MXP-351. The test used an existing engine with an experimental injector, the first 'Machete', producing  thrust. Development of their 3D printed regen lunar engine that would use MXP-351 to land on the Moon continued. , a  thrust version of Machete for the terrestrial testbed of the lander, dubbed XL-1T, was being manufactured.

In October 2017, NASA extended the Lunar CATALYST agreement for 2 years.

On 29 November 2018, it was announced that Masten was eligible to bid at a Commercial Lunar Payload Services (CLPS) contract by NASA. Should the proposal be accepted by NASA to be built, the landing to Moon would be no earlier than 2021.

On 8 April 2020, NASA selected Masten to deliver eight payloads – with nine science and technology instruments – to the South Pole of the Moon in 2022 with the XL-1 lander. Masten would also operate the payloads, helping to lay the foundation for human expeditions to the lunar surface beginning in 2024. The payloads, which included instruments to assess the composition of the lunar surface, test precision landing technologies, and evaluate the radiation on the Moon, were being delivered under NASA's Commercial Lunar Payload Services (CLPS) initiative as part of the agency's Artemis program. The US$75.9 million award included end-to-end services for delivery of the instruments, including payload integration, launch from Earth, landing on the surface of the Moon, and operation for at least 12 days. The payloads had predominantly been developed through two recent NASA Provided Lunar Payloads (NPLP) and Lunar Surface Instrument and Technology Payloads (LSITP) solicitations.

On 26 August 2020, Masten announced that the first XL-1 mission, Masten Mission One, would be launched by SpaceX, although it was not at the time publicly known which SpaceX launch vehicle it would fly on.

On 23 June 2021, Masten announced that the launch of Masten Mission One had been delayed to November 2023 due to COVID-19 pandemic related issues.

XL-1T
The XL-1T was a (T)errestrial technology and process demonstrator for the XL-1 and XEUS. A terrestrial flying test-bed was being used since lack of vehicle access to lunar landers after launch would make Masten's incremental design and test development methodology difficult and very expensive. Like the XL-1, the XL-1T was under development in partnership with NASA CATALYST (SAAM ID 18250).

The XL-1T was expected to have a dry mass of 588.93 kg and a wet mass of 1270.68 kg which was less than the XL-1. The vehicle had 4 off Machete 4400 N main engines able to throttle between 25% and 100% (4:1). The propellant was MPX-351. Yaw and pitch were controlled by differential throttling. There were 4 off 22 N ACS thrusters to control roll.

Many characteristics of the XL-1T were deliberately made similar to the XL-1. These included multi-engine architecture, avionics, software, fuel, movement of inertia, slosh management, and mission design tools.

XS-1
Masten was awarded a  contract from DARPA to develop the XS-1 experimental spaceplane. Project ended as DARPA awarded the Phase 2 to Boeing.

Other products and services
In addition to its line of vehicles, Masten Space Systems was offering its internally developed igniters and engines commercially to interested and qualified parties. Masten also had stated its intent at multiple conferences to participate in technology maturation and proof of concept projects.

Broadsword 

Broadsword was a  methane/liquid oxygen rocket engine Masten Space Systems was developing for the US government. Advanced manufacturing techniques would permit the engine to be used to provide a lower-cost reusable launch service for the growing CubeSat and smallsat launch market. The prototype engine took 1.5 months to construct and was made of aluminium. The engine consisted of 3 parts that were bolted together. The engine used an expander cycle and was planned to produce  with a bell extension in vacuum.

The development of a technology demonstration unit was completed in September 2016. The hot-fire test campaign concluded with the demonstration of six successful engine starts.

, a second development unit containing enhancements was being developed for NASA under the Tipping Point program with the aim of being flight qualified.

Cutlass 

Cutlass was a  methane/liquid oxygen rocket engine Masten Space Systems was developing for the US government. Built using aluminium alloy via additive manufacturing techniques. Cutlass evolved into a low cost expendable upper stage engine using a gas generator cycle. A Phase 2 SBIR grant was not awarded so development was put on hold.

Katana 
They were designed for indefinite runtime and good throttle response. A video of the all aluminium Katana KA6A Regen 2800 lbf engine's shake down test burning LOX/IPA (Isopropyl alcohol).

Machete 

Machete was the name for a family of throttleable rocket engine designs Masten Space Systems was developing to permit their XL-1 lunar lander to land on the Moon. The Machete rocket engines burned the nontoxic storable hypergolic propellant combination MXP-351. The first Machete had an experimental injector design that was used to test MXP-351 in 2016, producing a thrust of 225 lbf. , Masten was modifying the design to make the engines additively-manufactured with regeneratively-cooled thrust chambers. Machete engines were being scaled up to produce 1000 lb thrust for a terrestrial test-bed version dubbed (XL-1T).

MXP-351
MXP-351 was Masten Space's internal name for a self-igniting bipropellant combination invented to fuel its small lunar landers. Unlike the traditional NTO/MMH bipropellant, the two propellant chemicals in MXP-351 were safer to handle because they are nontoxic. The bipropellant could also be stored at room temperatures, unlike liquid oxygen and liquid hydrogen. The hypergolic combination had an ISP of 322 seconds. The storage life of MXP-351 before use was undergoing long-term studies but was expected to be a few years. The reduced operation constraints might have permitted a reduction in recurring operating costs.

Masten Space used similar precautions when handling MXP-351 to those used for HTP (High-Test Peroxide). These included wearing splash protection clothing plus a simple chemical respirator. They claimed that spills could be rectified by diluting with water and rinsing away.

Masten Mission One
Masten Space Systems was to launch a lunar lander mission called Masten Mission One or MM1 in November 2023, using a SpaceX Falcon 9 or Falcon Heavy launch vehicle. It was to have a suite of payloads for NASA.

See also

References

External links 

 Masten Space Systems – Company homepage
 Masten YouTube – Company video at YouTube
 Masten/NASA Space Act Agreement - Amended September 2017 Covers XL-1, XL-1T and XEUS

Mojave Air and Space Port
Private spaceflight companies
Rocket engine manufacturers of the United States
Vehicle manufacturing companies established in 2004
Commercial Lunar Payload Services
Companies that filed for Chapter 11 bankruptcy in 2022